Kurt Knappe (2 June 1918 – 3 September 1943) was a Luftwaffe ace and recipient of the Knight's Cross of the Iron Cross during World War II.  The Knight's Cross of the Iron Cross was awarded to recognise extreme battlefield bravery or successful military leadership.  On 3 September 1943, Kurt Knappe was killed over Evreux, France after attacking a formation of B-17's.  During his career he was credited with 56 victories, 51 on the Eastern Front and 5 on the Western Front.

Summary of career

Aerial victory claims
According to US historian David T. Zabecki, Knappe was credited with 56 aerial victories.

Awards
 Aviator badge
 Front Flying Clasp of the Luftwaffe
 Ehrenpokal der Luftwaffe (18 May 1942)
 Iron Cross (1939)
 2nd Class
 1st Class
 German Cross in Gold (24 September 1942)
 Knight's Cross of the Iron Cross on 3 November 1942 as Unteroffizier and pilot in the 5./Jagdgeschwader 51 "Mölders"

References

Citations

Bibliography

External links
Aces of the Luftwaffe
TracesOfWar.com

1918 births
1943 deaths
Military personnel from Berlin
Luftwaffe pilots
German World War II flying aces
Recipients of the Gold German Cross
Recipients of the Knight's Cross of the Iron Cross
Luftwaffe personnel killed in World War II
Aviators killed by being shot down